XM4 may refer to:

 XM-4 Blues, a satellite operated by XM satellite radio
 XM 4, a radio channel from Sirus XM satellite radio; see List of Sirius XM Radio channels
 South African type XM4 tender, a steam locomotive tender
 Moller XM-4, a VTOL aircraft; see List of aircraft (Mo)
 Lipán XM4, a variant of the Argentine drone Lipán M3; see List of unmanned aerial vehicles
 XM4, a prototype version of the M4 carbine
 XM4 rocket launcher U.S. helicopter armament subsystems

See also

 
 XMA (disambiguation)
 XM (disambiguation)